Sergey Aleksandrovich Yevstigneyev (born 17 January 1974) is a water polo coach and retired Russian water polo player. He competed at the 1996 Summer Olympics and finished in fifth place with the Russian team, contributing 4 goals in 8 matches.

Career 
Yevstigneyev started training in water polo in 1983, and between 1992 and 1999 was a member of the national team, winning bronze medals at the 1994 world and 1997 European championships. In 1994 he met his future wife, Olympic synchronized swimmer Olga Brusnikina. They married in September 2001 and moved to Italy, where Yevstigneyev played for a local team and Brusnikina coached synchronized swimming. In August 2006 Brusnikina gave birth to a son, Iliya.

As of 2015 Yevstigneyev was living in Moscow and coaching the Russian men's water polo team.

See also
 List of World Aquatics Championships medalists in water polo

References

External links
 

1974 births
Living people
Russian male water polo players
Olympic water polo players of Russia
Water polo players at the 1996 Summer Olympics
World Aquatics Championships medalists in water polo
Russian water polo coaches
Russia men's national water polo team coaches